Naznin Faruque (born August 1, 1954) is an Indian social worker, politician and a Member of Parliament (Rajya Sabha) elected from Assam, India being an Indian National Congress candidate.

Early life and education
Faruque was born on August 1, 1954 in Nagaon in the Indian state of Assam. She is a graduate of Lady Kene College affiliated to North Eastern Hill University, Shillong, Meghalaya in Bachelor of Arts. She married Abdur Rahman Faruque on 10 January 1973.

Career
Faruque was Chairperson of State Weaving Manufacturing Cooperative Ltd., Assam from 1994 to 1996. She was elected to Rajya Sabha in April 2010. She served as a member of "Committee on Chemicals and Fertilizers", "Consultative Committee for the Ministry of Minority Affairs", "Committee on Empowerment of Women", "Committee on Member of Parliament Local Area Development Scheme" and "Court of the Assam Assembly".

Recognition
2009: "Bharat Jyoti Award".

References

Articles created or expanded during Women's History Month (India) - 2014
Living people
Rajya Sabha members from Assam
1954 births
People from Nagaon district
North-Eastern Hill University alumni
Women in Assam politics
Indian National Congress politicians from Assam
21st-century Indian women politicians
21st-century Indian politicians
Women members of the Rajya Sabha